John Brodie (born 1935) is an American NFL quarterback.

John Brodie may also refer to:

John Brodie (footballer, born 1862) (1862–1925), English International footballer
John Brodie (footballer, born 1896) (1896–?), Scottish footballer
John Brodie (footballer, born 1947), English footballer
John Brodie (footballer, died 1901), Scottish footballer (Burnley FC, Nottingham Forest)
John Alexander Brodie (1858–1934), British civil engineer
John H. Brodie (1970–2006), theoretical physicist
John Brodie (1905–1955), New Zealand writer who wrote as John Guthrie